Henry Keswick (1870 – 29 November 1928) was a British Conservative politician and businessman and member of the Executive Council and Legislative Council of Hong Kong.

Biography
Henry Keswick the first-born and only surviving son of William Keswick by his first wife Amelia Sophie Dubeux (d. 1883), born in 1870 in Shanghai, into the Keswick business dynasty. He was educated at Eton College and graduated with a B.A. at the Trinity College, Cambridge in 1892, of which he took his M.A. degree later. He was commissioned as a lieutenant in the 3rd (Militia) Battalion of the King's Own Scottish Borderers on 25 February 1893. He saw active service and was promoted to a captain. After the war had ended, he resigned his commission on 2 August 1902. He rejoined the battalion during the First World War in which he commanded until its disbandment. He was also a member of the Royal Company of Archers, a ceremonial unit that serves as the sovereign's bodyguard in Scotland.

He joined the family business and spent two years in the New York office of Jardines before he arrived in Hong Kong in 1895, the year before his Uncle James Johnstone Keswick left and became the taipan of the Jardine. During his time in the Far East, he went to Shanghai and became the chairman of the Shanghai Municipal Council from 24 August 1906 and served until May 1907.  He was also chairman of the Shanghai Chamber of Commerce.

He was appointed as Unofficial Member of the Legislative and Executive Councils during his time in Hong Kong. He was also vice-chairman of the Hong Kong General Chamber of Commerce and chairman of the Hongkong and Shanghai Banking Corporation, and Hongkong and Whampoa Dock Company as well as other numerous public companies. After he returned to England, he became the first chairman of the Far Eastern Section of the London Chamber of Commerce and member of the London Committee of the Hongkong and Shanghai Banking Corporation.

He returned to England in 1911 to represent Hong Kong at the coronation of King George V. He was still in England when his father died and succeeded him as the member of Parliament for the Conservative and Unionist in at the Epsom by-election in 1912, and held the seat until 1918. He was also member of the county council of Dumfriesshire, where he spent most of his latter life.

In 1922, he returned to Hong Kong and the Far East in his yacht "Cutty Sark".  He remained a director of Jardines until his death on 29 November 1928 in London.

Family
He married Ida Wynifred Johnston (born c.1880) in 1900 and had three children:
 David Johnston (1902 Yokohama – 1976); married Nony or Nonie Barbara Pease, and had children, including Amelia Sophia or Sophy Keswick whose children include: Percy Weatherall (b. 1957), Mrs Catherine Soames and Isobel, Countess of Strathmore and Kinghorne and another son.
 Sir William Johnston "Tony" Keswick (1903 Yokohama – 16 February 1990, London), a Taipan of Jardine Matheson 1934–1941; married Mary Etheldreda Lindley, and had 3 sons: Henry Keswick (knighted 2009 Birthday Honours), Sir Chips Keswick, and Simon Keswick.  His eldest and youngest sons were Tai-Pans. Two of his grandsons are based in Hong Kong, working for Jardine Matheson, one of whom, Ben Keswick, is the present Tai-pan in Hong Kong.
 Sir John Henry Keswick KCMG (1906 Dumfriesshire – 1982, Dumfriesshire) KCMG 1972, Tai-Pan of Jardine Matheson 1941–1953; married 1940 Clare Mary Alice Elwes (1906–1998), and had children the gardening author Maggie Keswick Jenks (1941–1995).  Father and daughter founded the Keswick Foundation, and Maggie Jenks established Maggie's Centres to help cancer victims, before her own death.  Maggie was married to landscape architect Charles Jencks, and left children.

References

1870 births
1928 deaths
Hong Kong businesspeople
Scottish businesspeople
Scottish expatriates in Hong Kong
Scottish expatriates in China
Scottish expatriates in Japan
Members of the Executive Council of Hong Kong
Members of the Legislative Council of Hong Kong
Chairmen of the Shanghai Municipal Council
Jardine Matheson Group
Chairmen of HSBC
Conservative Party (UK) MPs for English constituencies
UK MPs 1910–1918
Henry
British Army personnel of the Second Boer War
British Army personnel of World War I
King's Own Scottish Borderers officers
Alumni of Trinity College, Cambridge
Members of the Royal Company of Archers
People educated at Eton College